The 2009 NCAA Division III baseball tournament was played at the end of the 2009 NCAA Division III baseball season to determine the 34th national champion of college baseball at the NCAA Division III level. The tournament concluded with eight teams competing at Time Warner Cable Field at Fox Cities Stadium in Grand Chute, Wisconsin for the championship. Eight regional tournaments were held to determine the participants in the World Series. Regional tournaments were contested in double-elimination format, with five regions consisting of six teams and three consisting of eight, for a total of 54 teams participating in the tournament.

Bids
The 54 competing teams were:

Central Regional
Brunner Field in the Duane R. Swanson Stadium-Moline, IL (Host: Augustana College)

Mideast Regional
Nicolay Field-Adrian, MI (Host: Adrian College)

Mid-Atlantic Regional
FirstEnergy Park-Lakewood, NJ (Host: Kean University)

New England Regional
Eastern Baseball Stadium-Mansfield, CT (Host: Eastern Connecticut State University/Little East Conference)

South Regional
Arthur W. Perdue Stadium-Salisbury, MD (Host: Salisbury University)

New York Regional
Farmingdale State Baseball Stadium-East Farmingdale, NY (Host: State University of New York at Farmingdale/Skyline Conference)

West Regional
Roy Helser Field and Jim Wright Stadium-McMinnville, OR (Host: Linfield College)

Midwest Regional
E.J. Schneider Field-Oshkosh, WI (Host: University of Wisconsin-Oshkosh)

World Series
Time Warner Cable Field at Fox Cities Stadium-Grand Chute, WI (Host: University of Wisconsin-Oshkosh/Lawrence University/Fox Cities Convention and Visitors Bureau)

References

NCAA Division III Baseball Tournament
2009 college baseball season